Clontarf is a city in Swift County, Minnesota, United States. The population was 164 at the 2010 census.

History
Clontarf was platted in 1876, and named after Clontarf in Ireland, the native land of many of its early settlers. A post office has been in operation at Clontarf since 1876.

Geography

Minnesota State Highway 9 serves as a main route in the community.

Demographics

2010 census
As of the census of 2010, there were 164 people, 64 households, and 46 families living in the city. The racial makeup of the city was 99.4% White and 0.6% Asian. Hispanic or Latino of any race were 2.4% of the population.

There were 64 households, of which 31.3% had children under the age of 18 living with them, 60.9% were married couples living together, 3.1% had a female householder with no husband present, 7.8% had a male householder with no wife present, and 28.1% were non-families. 20.3% of all households were made up of individuals, and 4.7% had someone living alone who was 65 years of age or older. The average household size was 2.56 and the average family size was 2.96.

The median age in the city was 42.5 years. 23.2% of residents were under the age of 18; 10.9% were between the ages of 18 and 24; 19.5% were from 25 to 44; 34.1% were from 45 to 64; and 12.2% were 65 years of age or older. The gender makeup of the city was 57.9% male and 42.1% female.

2000 census
As of the census of 2000, there were 173 people, 62 households, and 46 families living in the city. The racial makeup of the city was 99.42% White and 0.58% Native American. Hispanic or Latino of any race were 3.47% of the population.

There were 62 households, out of which 41.9% had children under the age of 18 living with them, 58.1% were married couples living together, 3.2% had a female householder with no husband present, and 25.8% were non-families. 21.0% of all households were made up of individuals, and 11.3% had someone living alone who was 65 years of age or older. The average household size was 2.76 and the average family size was 3.20.

In the city, the population was spread out, with 33.5% under the age of 18, 4.6% from 18 to 24, 31.2% from 25 to 44, 19.7% from 45 to 64, and 11.0% who were 65 years of age or older. The median age was 34 years. For every 100 females, there were 113.6 males. For every 100 females age 18 and over, there were 98.3 males.

The median income for a household in the city was $55,139, and the median income for a family was $57,321. Males had a median income of $29,750 versus $30,313 for females. The per capita income for the city was $17,048. None of the families and 4.4% of the population were living below the poverty line, including no under eighteens and 15.4% of those over 64.

References

Cities in Minnesota
Cities in Swift County, Minnesota